The Roman Catholic Diocese of Sioux Falls is a Roman Catholic diocese in the U.S. state of South Dakota.  It comprises that part of South Dakota east of the Missouri River. It is a suffragan see of the Archdiocese of Saint Paul and Minneapolis. The See city for the diocese is Sioux Falls.  The cathedral parish is St. Joseph Cathedral.

History

On August 12, 1879 Pope Leo XIII established the Vicariate Apostolic of Dakota from territory taken from the Diocese of Saint Paul, Minnesota.  It lost territory on November 10, 1889 when the Diocese of Jamestown was established in North Dakota.  Two days later on November 12 the Diocese of Sioux Falls was established and the vicariate was suppressed. 

The diocese lost territory in 1902 when the Diocese of Lead was established in South Dakota west of the Missouri River.  The architect for the St. Joseph Cathedral was Emmanuel Louis Masqueray.

Abuse cases in Catholic institutions in South Dakota
Beginning in 2003 and extending to mid-2010, Native Americans who had been students at boarding schools, mission schools and other Catholic institutions in South Dakota began filing suits for having been physically and sexually abused at those places. Some cases dated from the 1950 to 1970s; others were more recent. They sued the dioceses of Rapid City and Sioux Falls, in addition to the orders of priests and sisters that operated these facilities, and named individual alleged predators, including staff members, in court documents. By 2010, more than 100 plaintiffs had joined these suits.

In March 2019, the Diocese of Sioux Falls published the names of eleven priests accused of child sex abuse of parishioners between 1950 and 1992. This is consistent with the national policy of the Church by then, as it works to be more transparent about alleged abuses in the far-reaching abuse scandals that have engulfed the church in parishes across the country for two decades. 

In South Dakota and elsewhere, the officials of the dioceses have noted that they do not have responsibility for alleged abuses at off-reservation and mission boarding schools that were operated by priests and nuns from a variety of religious orders, which have independence within the Catholic Church. These orders operate separately from any diocese. Plaintiffs have filed separate suits against the officials at the schools, the orders that operated them, and specific named defendants, in cases dating from 2003 to 2010. 

Within the territory of the Diocese of Sioux Falls, institutions named in these suits include St. Paul's Indian Mission School, grades K-12 (in 1975 it was transferred to the Yankton Sioux Tribe, which renamed it as Marty Indian School and operates it); St. Joseph's Indian School, an off-reservation facility in Chamberlain, South Dakota; and Tekakwitha Indian Mission School (with an associated orphanage) on the Lake Traverse Indian Reservation in Sisseton, South Dakota, and the orders that operated them. Tekakwitha School was closed in the 1970s during the transfer to tribes, and the building was demolished.

Bishops
The ordinaries of the Diocese of Sioux Falls (and its predecessor) and their dates of service:

Vicar Apostolic of Dakota
 Martin Marty, O.S.B. (1879–1889); see below

Bishops of Sioux Falls
 Martin Marty, O.S.B. (1889–1895), appointed bishop of Saint Cloud; see above
 Thomas O'Gorman, C.S.P. (1896–1921†)
 Bernard Joseph Mahoney (1922–1939†)
 William O. Brady (1939–1956), appointed Coadjutor Archbishop and later Archbishop of Saint Paul
 Lambert Anthony Hoch (1956–1978), retired
 Paul Vincent Dudley (1978–1995), retired
 Robert James Carlson (1995–2004), appointed Bishop of Saginaw and later Archbishop of St. Louis
 Paul J. Swain (2006–2019), retired
 Donald DeGrood (2020–present)

Coadjutor bishop
Robert James Carlson (1994-1995)

Auxiliary bishop
Paul Francis Anderson (1982-1987)

Other priests of the Diocese of Sioux Falls who became bishops
The following men began their service as priests in Sioux Falls before being appointed bishops elsewhere:
 Thomas Gullickson, appointed Apostolic Nuncio and Titular Archbishop in 1976 
Donald Joseph Kettler, appointed Bishop of Fairbanks in 2002. Later appointed Bishop of Saint Cloud  in 2013.

Schools
 Mount Marty University, Yankton
 Presentation College, South Dakota, Aberdeen
 Aberdeen Catholic School System, Aberdeen
 Roncalli High School (9-12)
 Roncalli Middle School (7-8)
 Roncalli Elementary School (3-6)
 Roncalli Primary School (K-2)
 Roncalli SonShine Patch Preschool (3K-PK)

 Bishop O'Gorman Catholic Schools, Sioux Falls
 O'Gorman Catholic High School
 O'Gorman Junior High School (9-12)
 Christ the King Elementary (7-8)
 Holy Spirit Elementary (PK-6)
 St. Katherine Drexel Elementary (PK-6)
 St. Lambert Elementary (PK-6)
 St. Mary Elementary (PK-6)
 St. Michael Elementary  (PK-6)
 Holy Trinity Catholic School, Huron
 Holy Trinity Elementary (K-5)
 Immaculate Conception Catholic School, Watertown
 Immaculate Conception Elementary (PK-6)
 John Paul II Catholic School, Mitchell
 John Paul II Elementary (K-6)
 Noah's Ark Preschool
 Sacred Heart Catholic Schools, Yankton
 Sacred Heart Elementary (PK-5)
 Sacred Heart Middle School (6-8)
 St. Agnes Catholic School, Vermillion
 St. Agnes Elementary (PK-5)
 St. Joseph Catholic School, Pierre
 St. Joseph Elementary (K-5)
 St. Joseph's Indian School, Chamberlain
 St. Joseph Indian (1-8)
 St. Lawrence Catholic School, Milbank
 St. Lawrence Elementary (PK-6)
 St. Mary Catholic Schools, Dell Rapids
 St. Mary High School (9-12)
 St. Mary Junior High School (7-8)
 St. Mary Elementary (PK-6)
 St. Mary's School, Salem
 St. Mary Elementary (1-7)
 St. Thomas School, Madison
 St. Thomas Elementary (PK-5)
 St. Thomas More Catholic School, Brookings
 St. Thomas More Elementary (PK-3)

See also

 Catholic Church by country
 Catholic Church in the United States
 Ecclesiastical Province of Saint Paul and Minneapolis
 Global organisation of the Catholic Church
 List of Roman Catholic archdioceses (by country and continent)
 List of Roman Catholic dioceses (alphabetical) (including archdioceses)
 List of Roman Catholic dioceses (structured view) (including archdioceses)
 List of the Catholic dioceses of the United States

References

External links 
Roman Catholic Diocese of Sioux Falls Official Site

 
Sioux Falls
Diocese of Sioux Falls
Culture of Sioux Falls, South Dakota
Religious organizations established in 1889
Sioux Falls
Sioux Falls